Brunswick Wharf was a railway goods yard in Buglawton, Congleton.

Brunswick Wharf was used to transport sand from Congleton to the potteries and coal from the potteries to Brunswick Wharf along the Biddulph Valley Line.

History 
Brunswick Wharf was the terminus of the Biddulph Valley Line. Brunswick Wharf was opened by the North Staffordshire Railway on 29 August 1860.

While using the Biddulph Valley Line for most the journey, goods trains heading to Brunswick Wharf would leave the Biddulph Valley Line at Congleton Lower Junction. Goods trains would then follow a line underneath the North Staffordshire mainline which was used to reach Brunswick Wharf and a goods and mineral yard at Congleton railway station.

Ever Saturday morning there was a sand train service from Brunswick Wharf to Warrington and St Helens. The sand that was taken from Brunswick Wharf was used in the Lancashire glass industry.

During the heyday of the Biddulph Valley Line the Robbert-heath owned Collieries operated private mineral trains between their various sites to and from Brunswick Wharf.

When trams were being built for Manchester and other local cities, metal was brought to Brunswick Wharf to be molded down into brake blocks for trams, once built the brake blocks would leave Brunswick Wharf to be used for tram building.

The decision to close Brunswick Wharf "baffled" the staff due to how busy and well used Brunswick Wharf was.

The last train left Brunswick Wharf on 1 April 1968 after which Brunswick Wharf closed.

With the closure of Brunswick Wharf sand had to be brought to Congleton via Congleton railway station and coal had to be brought to Congleton via Kidsgrove railway station.

Plans were drawn up by North Staffordshire Railway Society in the 1970s to reopen Brunswick Wharf as part of a planned heritage railway going from Brunswick Wharf to Bidulph Railway station via the Biddulph Valley Line. This plan was created in order preserve some of the Biddulph Valley Line. Due to lack of interest from Cheshire County Council and the general public this plan was abandoned.

Operation
Brunswick Wharf comprised 3 sidings called "Wharfs" operated by 3 different companies. These companies were:
 Robbert Heath and Low Moor.
 The Congleton and Industrial & Equitable Co-operative society.
 H. Hargreaves & Co. Ltd, coal, coke and lime merchants.

Staff

Below is a list of staff who worked at Brunswick Wharf and their job titles and/or employer if known:
 Harry Walton.
 Mr Minshull. (Yard Forman)
 John Butler.
 Charles Yates.
 Jack Holland.
Charlie Butler.
Frank Emery. (British Rail checker)
Fred Jackson. (British Rail loader)
Stan Woodward. (Co-op Yard Forman)
Joel Boon. (Gillow heath)
Jack Greenford.
Billy Smith.
Ralf Goodwin.
Bill Willett.
Will Shaw.

References 

Congleton